Countess Adriana of Nassau-Siegen (7 February 1449 – 15 January 1477), official titles: Gräfin zu Nassau, Vianden und Diez, Frau zu Breda, was a countess from the House of Nassau-Siegen, a cadet branch of the Ottonian Line of the House of Nassau, and through marriage Countess of Hanau-Münzenberg.

Biography
Adriana was born in Breda on 7 February 1449 as the fourth daughter of Count John IV of Nassau-Siegen and his wife Lady Mary of Looz-Heinsberg.

Adriana married on 12 September 1468 to Count Philip I of Hanau-Münzenberg (21 September 1449 – 26 August 1500), the son of Count Reinhard III of Hanau and Countess Palatine Margaret of Mosbach.

On her epitaph, she is depicted in a praying position towards the (no longer extant) high altar. This epitaph and her gravestone have been preserved very well.

Issue
From the marriage of Adriana and Philip the following children were born:
 A daughter (1469 – ?).
 Adriana (Hanau, 1 May 1470 – 12 April 1524), married in Hanau on 15 February 1489 to Count Philip of Solms-Lich (15 August 1468 – Frankfurt, 3 October 1544).
 Margaret (6 April 1471 – Liebenau monastery, 5 September 1503), was a nun at Liebenau monastery.
 Count Reinhard IV (14 March 1473 – 30 January 1512), succeeded his father in 1500. He married in 1496 to Countess Catherine of Schwarzburg (? – 27 November 1514).
 Anne (15 March 1474 – 21 March 1475).
 Mary (4 March 1475 – 18 May 1476).

Ancestors

Literature

Notes

References

Sources
 
 
 
 
 
 
 
  (1882). Het vorstenhuis Oranje-Nassau. Van de vroegste tijden tot heden (in Dutch). Leiden: A.W. Sijthoff/Utrecht: J.L. Beijers.

External links

 Hanau. In: An Online Gotha, by Paul Theroff.
 Nassau. In: Medieval Lands. A prosopography of medieval European noble and royal families, by Charles Cawley.
 Nassau Part 4. In: An Online Gotha, by Paul Theroff.

|-

1449 births
1477 deaths
Adriana of Nassau-Siegen
Adriana of Nassau-Siegen
∞|Adriana of Nassau-Siegen
Adriana of Nassau-Siegen
15th-century German women